"The General Lee" is a song co-written by and originally recorded by Johnny Cash for the 1982 soundtrack album to the television series The Dukes of Hazzard.

The General Lee was the name of the car the Dukes drove on the show.

Released as a single in 1982 (Scotti Bros. ZS5 02803, with "Duelin' Dukes" narrated by Sorrell Booke on the opposite side), "The General Lee" reached number 26 on U.S. Billboard country chart.

Track listing

Charts

In popular culture 
The song is featured in the game Grand Theft Auto V, where it can be heard on Rebel Radio.

References

External links 
 "The General Lee" on the Johnny Cash official website

Johnny Cash songs
1982 songs
1982 singles
Songs written by Thom Bresh
Songs written by Johnny Cash
Scotti Brothers Records singles